Colin Hamilton is a Scottish curler.

At the national level, he is a three-time Scottish men's champion curler (1981, 1982, 1994) and a two-time Scottish mixed champion curler (1994, 1995). Also he is a 1978 Scottish junior champion curler.

Awards
 WJCC Sportsmanship Award:

Teams

Men's

Mixed

References

External links

Living people
Scottish male curlers
Scottish curling champions
Year of birth missing (living people)
Place of birth missing (living people)